Alan Hector Sinclair (17 April 1900 – 1 September 1972) was an Australian rules footballer who played with the St Kilda Football Club in the Victorian Football League (VFL).

Notes

External links 

1900 births
1972 deaths
Australian rules footballers from Melbourne
St Kilda Football Club players
People from Brunswick, Victoria